Elsterberg station is a railway station in the municipality of Elsterberg, located in the Vogtlandkreis in Saxony, Germany.

References

Railway stations in Saxony
Buildings and structures in Vogtlandkreis